The Southern Philippines Medical Center (SPMC) is a government hospital under the Department of Health of the Republic of the Philippines. It is located at the JP Laurel Ave, Bajada, Davao City. It began as the Davao Medical Center. Its name was changed on November 19, 2009, by Republic Act 9792.

History
The health facility was established in 1917 as the Davao Public Hospital. It was initially a 25-bed capacity hospital along San Pedro Street. In 1946, The hospital was renamed as the Davao General Hospital and its capacity was increased to about 200 beds. In 1957, the hospital transferred to its current location at JP Laurel Ave. in Bajada. It was renamed Davao Regional Medical and Training Center by virtue of the Republic Act 1859.

In 1966, the hospital was transferred to the  site. Because of its importance in health care delivery, the Department of Health issued Administrative Order 157 designating it as the medical center for Mindanao and Sulu. During the martial law years and the Moro and the communist rebellion in the Philippines, the hospital was the major trauma center.

In 1986, the Davao Mental Hospital, which had been an extension of the National Center for Mental Health was transferred to the hospital. At that time, the hospital was renamed the Davao Medical Center and the bed capacity was increased to 600. The name Davao Regional Hospital and Training Center was then transferred to the then Davao del Norte Provincial Hospital. In 2009, the bed capacity was further increased from 600 to 1,200.

It officially became the largest hospital in the Philippines after it was authorized to expand its capacity to 1,500 beds when the Republic Act No 11326 was approved on April 17, 2019, surpassing that of the Philippine General Hospital's 1,334 beds. The actual capacity of the hospital as of April 2019 is 4000 beds.

During 2020 coronavirus pandemic in the Philippines, Southern Philippines Medical Center became the main receiving center for confirmed COVID-19 patients in Mindanao. The hospital can now also perform confirmatory tests for the patients with the coronavirus independently.

Facilities and management
The Southern Philippines Medical Center has several hospital buildings. This include:

Main Building – Three floors
Medical Arts Building – Seven floors
Central ICU Building – Five floors
Children Institute – Five floors
Kidney Transplant Institute – Five floors
Trauma Complex – Four floors
Institute for Women's Health and Newborn – Four floors
Orthopedic and Rehab Institute – Four floors
OPD Building – Four floors
Mindanao Heart Center – Three floors
Cancer Institute – Three floors (main), two floors (extension)
Isolation Facility Building – Two floors
Institute for Psychiatry and Behavioral Medicine – Two floors

Although the hospital is located in Davao City and is the only public hospital in the city, it is not the jurisdiction of the city government. The hospital is classified as a regional hospital. It is authorized by law to have a maximum bed capacity of 1,500, although the actual capacity as of April 2019 is 1,453 beds.

References

Hospital buildings completed in 1917
Hospitals established in 1917
Hospitals in the Philippines
Buildings and structures in Davao City
20th-century architecture in the Philippines